Andreas Eriksson may refer to:
 Andreas Eriksson (footballer) (born 1981), Swedish footballer
 Andreas Eriksson (visual artist) (born 1975), Swedish visual artist